Draco taeniopterus, the Thai flying dragon, barred flying dragon, or barred gliding lizard, is a species of agamid lizard. It is found in Myanmar, Thailand, Cambodia, and Malaysia.

References

Draco (genus)
Reptiles of Myanmar
Reptiles described in 1861
Taxa named by Albert Günther